Robert Gordon University, commonly called RGU, is a public university in the city of Aberdeen, Scotland. It became a university in 1992, and originated from an educational institution founded in the 18th century by Robert Gordon, a prosperous Aberdeen merchant, and various institutions which provided adult and technical education in the 19th and early 20th centuries. It is one of two universities in the city, the other being the University of Aberdeen. RGU is a campus university and its single campus in Aberdeen is at Garthdee, in the south-west of the city.

The university awards degrees in a wide range of disciplines from BA/BSc to PhD, primarily in professional, technical, health and artistic disciplines and those most applicable to business and industry. A number of traditional academic degree programmes are also offered, such as in the social sciences. In addition, the university's academic and research staff produce research in a number of areas.

History

The university derives from Robert Gordon's Hospital, an institution set up in the mid-18th century to provide the poor with a basic education and reasonable start in life, and the various educational institutions which developed in Aberdeen to provide adults with technical, vocational and artistic training, mostly in the evenings and part-time. Following numerous mergers between these establishments, it became Robert Gordon's Technical College in 1910, then following further developments became Robert Gordon's Institute of Technology in 1965 and began to conduct increasing amounts of research and provide degree-level education. It became a university in 1992, and now mostly offering day classes to full-time students. Unlike some modern universities in the UK which were created following the government reforms of 1992, it has never been a polytechnic, which were never part of the Scottish education system.

Founding institutions

Robert Gordon was a Scottish merchant, who had grown up in Aberdeen and graduated from Marischal College. Following a successful career, mostly in Danzig where he amassed a fortune, he retired to Aberdeen around 1720. In the last decade of his life, he prepared plans for a Hospital similar to that founded in Edinburgh by George Heriot.  The purpose of Robert Gordon's Hospital was "the Maintenance, Aliment, Entertainment and Education of young boys whose parents are poor and indigent... and to put them to Trades and Employment". Gordon died in 1731, and left his entire fortune to the project. However, it took nearly two decades for buildings to be completed, with the first boys admitted in 1750. The aim was not a sophisticated education, but to provide the poor with a reasonable start in life. Boys were taken in between 8 and 11 years old and received food, accommodation and a basic education including English, Latin, writing and arithmetic. They left the Hospital between 14 and 16 years old as an apprentice in a trade or to a merchant. The Hospital expanded through the 18th and 19th centuries.

Meanwhile, in the early 19th century, the Industrial Revolution led to a greater need for scientific and technical education for working-class adults, with "Mechanic's Institutes" spreading through Scotland, patterned on that founded by George Birkbeck at Glasgow (he would later found Birkbeck College, the University of London's night school). The Aberdeen Mechanic's Institution opened in 1824 providing evening classes in subjects such as physics, chemistry, mathematics, book-keeping, maritime navigation and art. By 1855 it was receiving government funding as the School of Science and Art, with a Technical School founded two years later.

Child and adult education combined: Robert Gordon's College (1881)

Government education reforms in the 1870s saw the "Hospital" system fall out of favour and encouraged mergers with other educational establishments. As part of these reforms, the Aberdeen Mechanic's Institute and Technical School merged with Robert Gordon's Hospital in 1881. The resulting institution was known as Robert Gordon's College. It provided an education for boys but as a day school only, and evening (and later day) classes for adults (male and female) in science, technology, commerce and general subjects. Art classes offered by the Mechanic's Institution were transferred to a new, independent School of Art close by, paid for by local businessman John Gray and opened in 1885.

Splitting child from adult: Robert Gordon's Technical College (1910 on)

By the end of the 19th century, Robert Gordon's College was a major provider of technical education, receiving large government grants. Following further reforms, in 1903 the adult education part of the college was designated a Central Institution along with Gray's School of Art (which had become a Central Institution two years earlier), allowing the adult education activities to develop independently rather than under the control of the local School Board. However, even this was not sufficient to meet demand for technical education, and dedicated Technical Colleges were being set up in other Scottish cities. As a result, in 1910 adult education activities were split from the school and became Robert Gordon's Technical College. Also merged into the new Technical College was the city's School of Domestic Economy which provided classes in domestic science. The day school for boys continued as Robert Gordon's College, and the two institutions shared a campus, buildings and until 1981, a Board of Governors and administrative staff.

During the 1920s, the first Ordinary and Higher Certificates and Diplomas were awarded, and by the 1930s Robert Gordon's Technical College was made up of Schools of Engineering, Chemistry, Maths & Physics, Pharmacy, Art (including architecture), Domestic Science, and Navigation. Around this time the first students began to be prepared for external degree examinations – for the University of Aberdeen's BSc in engineering. A system of student governance also developed, with a Student Representative Council formed in 1931. In the closing years of World War II, candidates started to be prepared to sit exams for external degrees of the University of London, in subjects such as Chemistry and Engineering, but only via part-time and/or evening classes. After 1945, to aid with settling large numbers of returning soldiers into a career, the Government backed a Business Training Scheme which allowed the Technical College to introduce courses in Business Administration.

Technical College to Institute (1965) to University (1992)

In 1955, the Technical College received a large gift of land.  Local Architect, property developer and entrepreneur Tom Scott Sutherland, purchased the Victorian manor and estate of Garthdee House in 1953 on the outskirts of the city. Finding himself and his wife living out of only four rooms in the enormous mansion, he donated it and the estate in 1955 for a new school of architecture. These classes had taken place at Gray's School of Art, but had been expanding in the 1940s and 1950s and much more space was needed. Following completion of a modern extension to the house, the new Scott Sutherland School of Architecture opened in 1957. In 1966, Gray's School of Art also moved to a large new building on this estate, freeing its Schoolhill building for administrative use. By 2013, all activities had transferred to Garthdee, with the addition of land immediately adjacent purchased from Aberdeen City Council in the 1990s.

The 1963 Robbins Report on the future of UK higher education recommended major expansion, which led to the renaming of the institution to Robert Gordon's Institute of Technology to suggest its increasing role in higher education rather than further education. As well as new "plate-glass" universities, reforms following the report created the polytechnics in England, Wales and Northern Ireland. It also created the Council for National Academic Awards (CNAA) to allow non-university institutions (like the polytechnics and Scottish central institutions) to run programmes that graduated students with CNAA degrees. The institute's first CNAA degree programmes began in pharmacy in 1967, then in engineering, chemistry and physics in 1969, and expanded at undergraduate and postgraduate level to all disciplines. Around this time, the government also began to transfer non-degree teaching (e.g. certificate courses in navigation) to local-authority colleges.

During the 1960s, an academic committee structure was set up, headed from 1969 by an Academic Council. During the 1970s, these committees underwent expansion and reform to improve participation by academic staff in decision-making. For the first time, a faculty structure was introduced, with Faculties of Art & Architecture, Engineering, Arts, and Sciences, led by deans. A department dedicated to providing computer services to the institute was also established in 1974, and the first professorships were introduced in 1975. In 1981, the separation of the Board of Governors and administration staff from Robert Gordon's College was completed, although the school and Institute continued to share some buildings. Beginning in the 1970s, the institute also began to provide extensive consultancy and training for the North Sea oil industry, particularly in engineering and offshore safety and survival.

The Robert Gordon University (1992 to present)

Following the reforms of the Further and Higher Education Act 1992, the institute was awarded university status as The Robert Gordon University on 12 June 1992. The new university inherited numerous small campuses, and during the late 1990s and 2000s embarked on large building projects to consolidate teaching at its City Centre and Garthdee campuses, assisted by a large purchase of land at Garthdee from Aberdeen City Council in the mid-1990s. As new Garthee facilities were completed, the majority of these previous campuses were sold as land for housing development (such as at Kepplestone and King Street), while City Centre facilities that were no longer required were often sold to Robert Gordon's College, with the sale proceeds paying for the expansion and new construction at Garthdee. In the 1990s and 2000s student numbers also increased considerably, requiring new and larger facilities. A merger with the University of Aberdeen was discussed in 2002, but was rejected in favour of remaining separate but working in closer collaboration.

By 2000, the university had consolidated to two campuses, at Garthdee and a city centre campus at Schoolhill and St. Andrew Street in central Aberdeen. However, it had been planned since the early 1990s to eventually move all facilities to a single campus at Garthdee and additional land was purchased to enable buildings to be constructed to house academic departments which had been at the city centre campus. The first phase was completed in summer 2013 with the opening of the Sir Ian Wood building (formally opened in July 2015). The only remaining building at the City-Centre campus is the Administration Building on Schoolhill.

Controversies

Donald Trump honorary degree
In 2010, RGU gained international attention for awarding an honorary degree to controversial American businessman Donald Trump. This was featured in the 2012 documentary film You've Been Trumped which documented the progress of the construction of Trump's golf course near Aberdeen from the point of view of local residents. In the film Dr David Kennedy, former Principal of the university, is shown handing back his own honorary degree in protest at the university's action in awarding the degree to Trump.

In December 2015 the university's then Principal, Professor Ferdinand von Prondzynski, announced he was reviewing the honorary degree and expressed his alarm at statements made by Donald Trump. Then on 9 December 2015 the honorary degree was revoked. RGU publicly stated: "In the course of the current US election campaign (2016), Mr Trump has made a number of statements that are wholly incompatible with the ethos and values of the university. The university has therefore decided to revoke its award of the honorary degree". The revoking of Donald Trump's honorary doctorate came in excess of 4 years after the businessman accused the then-incumbent US President Barack Obama of illegitimacy on the basis of unsubstantiated accusations that Obama was born in Kenya and therefore not a US citizen.

Vice Principal appointment 
In May 2018 an internal probe was launched after an anonymous whistleblower noted that RGU's newly appointed Vice-Principal for Commercial and Regional Innovation, Gordon McConnell, was co-director with Principal Ferdinand von Prondzynski in Knockdrin Estates Limited, a non-trading micro-company holding von Prondzynski's family castle and estate. Published on 4 July 2018, the investigation found that McConnell "did not declare in his declaration of interest form (completed in September 2017, following his appointment) that he was a director of Knockdrin Estates Limited" as well as revealing that this form was co-signed by von Prondzynski as his line manager. The inquiry found that whilst the Principal failed to declare this link at the time of Gordon McConnell's appointment, it also expressed the view of the board that he did not deliberately conceal any information.

The finding led to a letter of resignation from another of the three Vice-Principals, Paul Hagan, who condemned RGU for failing to punish the pair, stating that this damaged the institution. Hagan later withdrew his resignation in response to Prondzynski's departure.

On 9 August 2018, von Prondzynski announced that he would voluntarily step down from his post on 31 August. In the same press release, RGU announced that Deputy Principal John Harper had already been appointed to succeed Prondzynski.

Campus

RGU operates a single campus in Aberdeen, in the south-western suburbs at Garthdee. As of August 2017 all academic and administrative departments are located at Garthdee.

Garthdee campus

The Garthdee campus is the university's main campus, where all academic departments are located and teaching and research takes place.

The Garthdee campus is situated in the south-west of the city. For much of its history it was a greenfield site, with parts used as the gardens and estate of the Victorian manor of Garthdee House, farmland, and open meadows. The first university buildings were in use from the 1950s.
The Garthdee campus has seen major investment in recent years, with numerous new buildings constructed since the late 1990s which include a "University Street", part of Norman Foster's design concept for the modern campus.

The main buildings of the campus are:
Sir Ian Wood building (formerly Riverside East) - Houses the University Library and departments of pharmacy, life sciences, computing, architecture and engineering. The building was renamed at its official opening in July 2015 by the Princess Royal.
Aberdeen Business School building, which houses the departments of Accounting & Finance, Communication & Media, Information Management, Law, and Management, and a large Study Centre which occupies the former library space.
Faculty of Health and Social Care building houses the Schools of Applied Social Studies, Nursing & Midwifery, and Health Sciences. The building also acts as a hub for student services, with the university's student helpdesk, careers service, disability and dyslexia service, accommodation office and counselling service located in facilities off the main atrium
The RGU SPORT building is a campus sports and fitness centre, designed by architectural firm Thomson Craig & Donald and opened in 2005 at a cost of £10.7 million, including support from organisations such as sportscotland. It provides extensive facilities for sport, exercise and physical training, including several gyms with facilities for cardiovascular and resistance training, a 25-metre swimming pool, climbing wall, studios for group exercise classes, and a large sports hall for a wide range of indoor sports. The RGU SPORT Building also includes Union Way, the home of the RGU:Union offices, Deeview Student Store and social area.
The International College (ICRGU) building is a modular pre-fabricated two-storey building situated at the rear of RGU SPORT. It was constructed in 2011 to provide additional teaching space for the "International College at RGU" (ICRGU).
The Gray's School of Art building opened in 1966 to allow the art school to expand from its Victorian building next to the Aberdeen Art Gallery in the city centre used as the university's Administration Building before moving to Garthdee, and also considered as an extension to The Art Gallery until its eventual use as part of Robert Gordon's College.
Garthdee House is the location of the Principal's Office. It is a Victorian manor house which formed the core of the Garthdee estate, which with later purchases of adjacent land became today's campus. The Scott Sutherland School of Architecture was the sole user of Garthdee House until 2013, when the Principal's Office also moved into the building.

City centre facilities

Until recently the university continued to operate one non-academic facility in the city-centre. The building at Schoolhill is situated next to the Aberdeen Art Gallery and Robert Gordon's College, a private school which is no longer affiliated to the university but shares a common heritage and motto. The Administration Building is listed as an architecturally significant building, constructed in the Victorian period of carved and ornamented granite, typical of Aberdeen's famous Granite City architecture. In August 2017 all non-academic staff completed the move to the main campus at Garthdee.

Also located there was the old city centre campus. Many of these buildings were sold over the years to Robert Gordon's College for school use, while others have been sold for redevelopment. In July 2014, the St. Andrew Street building (which had been replaced by the Sir Ian Wood building at the Garthdee campus) was sold to the Canadian hotel Sandman Hotels group to be converted to a four-star hotel. The 12,000 square metre building was constructed around 1908 and had served as the Aberdeen College of Education until purchased in 1968; the university claimed it to be the third-largest granite building in Europe, after the Spanish Escorial palace near Madrid, and Marischal College. The university plans to retain the historic Administration Building for the foreseeable future.

Administration building
The former Administration Building has a frontage directly onto the public street of Schoolhill and was completed in 1885. It is a significantly larger building than the street frontage suggests. On completion, it housed Gray's School of Art and was designed by the prominent Aberdeen architect Alexander Marshall Mackenzie, who designed many of the city's grand granite buildings in the 19th century. The building is constructed of grey and pink Corrennie granite ashlar with Corinthian columns and was designed to match the Aberdeen Art Gallery adjacent to it, and like these buildings, it is Category A listed by Historic Scotland. 

As the School of Art grew in size, the building was extended in 1896 and again between 1928 and 1931. However, it eventually became too small and when Gray's School of Art moved to a new modernist building at Garthdee in the 1960s (see above), the building was converted for administrative use. From then until 2013 it housed the Principal's office, which moved to Garthdee House at the Garthdee campus, followed by the administrative staff in 2017.

In 2019, the Administration building was redeveloped in partnership with Opportunity North East and Codebase, to become a "digital entrepreneurship hub" in the city centre. Robert Gordon University will retain an area of the building to host events and activities offering staff, students and alumni training and funding to develop business ideas. The facility includes co-working space, offices, and event areas for university start-up teams and businesses working with ONE Codebase.

Organisation and governance

Academic faculties
Academic activities at the university are divided into 11 schools. Each school is led by a head of school and is sub-divided into departments. There are also numerous administrative departments which support the university's activities. All academic Schools and Departments are based at the main Garthdee campus.

 Aberdeen Business School
 School of Applied Social Studies
 School of Computing
 School of Creative and Cultural Business
 School of Engineering
 Gray's School of Art
 School of Health Sciences
 The Law School
 School of Nursing, Midwifery and Paramedic Practice
 School of Pharmacy and Life Sciences
 The Scott Sutherland School of Architecture & Built Environment

Governance

Under the terms of the Further and Higher Education (Scotland) Act 1992 and The Robert Gordon University (Scotland) Order of Council 1993, the university's governing body comprises a Board of Governors, consisting of 23 governors appointed to exercise the functions of management and control. The official head of the university is the Chancellor, although in practice he or she acts mainly in a ceremonial or symbolic role. At an operational level, most of the day-to-day management and control of the institution is delegated to the Principal and Vice Chancellor (commonly known simply as the Principal). The Board of Governors also delegates functions relating to the overall planning, co-ordination, development and supervision of academic affairs to the university's Academic Council. Both the Board of Governors and the Academic Council are supported by a wide range of committees.

Chancellors

 Sir Bob Reid (1992–2005)
 Sir Ian Wood KT (2005–2021)
Dame Evelyn Glennie CH (2021–present)
At Scottish universities, the Principal of the university is its general chief executive and is the administrative head of the institution, second in precedence only to the Chancellor. This means that the day-to-day running and leadership of the university is the responsibility of the Principal.

Principal and Vice-Chancellors

David A. Kennedy (1992–1997)
William Stevely CBE (1997–2005)
R. Michael Pittilo MBE (2005–2010)
John Harper (acting) (2010–2011)
Ferdinand von Prondzynski (2011–2018)
John Harper (2018–2020)
Steve Olivier (2020–present)

Academic profile

Reputation and rankings

In the subject league tables from The Guardian, it was first in Scotland for four subjects in 2017 (Health Professions; Journalism; Architecture; and Pharmacy), while securing three subjects in the UK top 10.

The Sunday Times awarded RGU the title of Best Modern University in the UK for 2012 in its University Guide 2012. The title had previously been won by Oxford Brookes University for each of the preceding ten years. RGU received the 2012 award partly due to ratings of the quality of teaching and research, but also due to its employment record which was judged the best of any UK university. RGU was also named as Best Modern University in the UK in The Times Good University Guide 2013.

In 2017, RGU received the TEF Gold Framework of Excellence in teaching.

Graduate employment

At one time, the Robert Gordon University had the highest rate among the UK universities of graduates in employment or postgraduate study six months after graduation. In 2015, HESA announced that 97.2% of RGU graduates were in work or further education within six months of graduating. Specialised institutions such as Royal College of Music, Institute of Education and Trinity Laban Conservatoire of Music and Dance scored higher than Robert Gordon University.

Symbols and identity

The university's logo and corporate identity make frequent use of the colour purple and the "Gordon" font, all of which appear extensively on campus signage, printed material and online. The current logo was unveiled in February 2013. From 2009 to 2013, the logo consisted of a roundel derived from the university's coat of arms.

Most universities in the UK are designated by order of the Privy Council; unusually for a university named after an individual, according to Robert Gordon University (Scotland) Order of Council 1993 the official name of the university includes the prefix "The" (as with The George Washington University, The Ohio State University and The College of William & Mary). However, current university branding typically leaves it out although it is still used for graduation.

Coat of Arms

The coat of arms derives from the one issued by the Lord Lyon King of Arms (the state official responsible for heraldry in Scotland) to Robert Gordon's Institute of Technology in 1982, which in turn derives from that first used in 1881 by the governors of Robert Gordon's Hospital when it became Robert Gordon's College. The arms consist of a shield only and are used infrequently, usually at formal occasions such as graduation, and can also be seen over the main entrance to the university's Administration Building at Schoolhill and various academic buildings at the main campus at Garthdee. The shield also formed the previous logo which still features on some older signage.

On the left side of the arms, the three boars on a blue background edged in gold are taken from the arms of the Gordon family, while on the right the castle on a red background is taken from the arms of the City of Aberdeen. This symbol of the city is shared with the arms of the University of Aberdeen. A black wavy band divides the two sides, and features heraldic symbols in gold representing technology (a mechanical cog), learning (a flaming torch) and commerce (a gold coin).

Motto
The university's motto is Omni Nunc Arte Magistra, which translates literally from Latin as "Now by all your mastered arts...", as if to suggest making use in everyday life of knowledge and skills gained. It is sometimes translated as "Make the best of all your abilities", although this is a somewhat more liberal rendering of the Latin. It comes from Virgil's Aeneid, Book VIII, line 441, as the god Vulcan encourages his workers at the forge. It shares this motto with Robert Gordon's College, who use it more frequently. Unlike some universities, the motto is not seen frequently, although it has appeared in graduation materials and is engraved on the shaft of the university's ceremonial mace.

Ceremonial mace

A ceremonial mace is used at many universities as a symbol of authority and independence. The RGU mace appears mainly at graduation ceremonies, where it is placed prominently on the stage in front of the Chancellor and Principal and in full view of the audience. It may also be seen occasionally at other important university events. The mace is a modern design in silver and black, designed and crafted in 1993 by Gordon Burnett (a member of staff at the university's Gray's School of Art), and paid for by Aberdeen City Council as a gift to the new university. It was presented to the university at a ceremony on 26 June that year during which the first chancellor of the university, Bob Reid, was installed. The mace is primarily jet-black, with wavy fins edged in silver that run vertically down the full length of the mace's head (reflecting the wavy black band in the university's coat of arms). The coat of arms of the university is inset into the head of the mace, along with golden symbols taken from it - the castle representing the city of Aberdeen, flaming torch, coin, and mechanical cog. The shaft of the mace is inlaid in gold with the university's motto, Omni Nunc Arte Magistra.

Tartan

Like most Scottish universities, RGU has its own tartan; it mirrors the university's official colours of Royal Blue, Red and Gold which appear on the coat of arms (although the purple brand is now the recognised face of the university). The tartan was designed by Michael King in 1997. Some students on their graduation day choose to wear a tartan kilt.

Student life

In 2015/16 there were 16,878 students enrolled of whom 63% were undergraduates and 35% were postgraduates with 2% in postgraduate research.

As well as full-time and part-time on-campus study, the university provides a range of distance learning facilities over the internet via its virtual learning environment, CampusMoodle.

Student Association
The first Student Representative Council was organised at Robert Gordon's Technical College in 1931, with activities such as sports clubs and societies following in the 1940s. A Student Union building opening in 1952 at Rubislaw Terrace in the city's West End. In 1969, the shop and bakery next to Gray's School of Art (now the Administration Building) on Schoolhill came on the market and were purchased by Robert Gordon's Institute of Technology. The Student Union building opened there in 1974 and remained until its closure in July 2014 as the campus relocated to Garthdee. RGU:Union is now located on Union Way inside the RGU SPORT building.

The students' union represents the views of the student community, and works to improve the student experience at the university. RGU:Union is run by an executive board of students who are elected in March each year. The Union has a team of full-time sabbatical Presidents, and part-time Vice Presidents. RGU:Union also operates a system of student representatives, student school officers, equality champions and more who work in partnership with the university to ensure quality teaching and learning.

RGU:Union also provides a range of extra-curricular opportunities. As of 2018, the union has over 41 affiliated societies, ranging from course based academic societies to hobby and interest based groups. The Union also runs a number of volunteering projects and activities. RGU's Raising and Giving group host various fundraising events to donate money and time to charity.

RGU:Union seeks to provide support and advice to students. Along with running an advice service, the Union also launched a student Nightline in February 2014 to provide a confidential student helpline from 8pm to 8am. Students run a number of campaigns to support student welfare including liberation weeks, sexual health campaigns and in September 2015, a Safe Taxi Scheme as an emergency provision to help students get home safely.

Student media

RGU:Union operates a student media program with RGU:Radio, RGU:TV and Radar Magazine. The student radio station, called RGU:Radio broadcasts live from a studio on campus, running a number of shows from music to current affairs. Broadcasts are streamed and regular podcasts are posted online.

RGU:TV produces regular videos about campus events, topical issues and student life and distributed them online through a YouTube channel.

Radar Magazine is a full-colour printed publication which is published three or four times each year. It features articles written by students covering campus events, student life, music, news, reviews, entertainment, fashion, sport and more. The magazine also has an online website where articles are posted regularly by students.

Accommodation
The university's Accommodation Services department arranges for students to be placed in one of nine halls of residence across the city.

By far the largest of the halls of residence are the Woolmanhill Flats at St. Andrew Street. The Woolmanhill flats have over 700 one-person bedrooms, arranged in self-catering flats of up to eight. The Woolmanhill Flats development was constructed in stages in the late 1980s and early 1990s by the university working in collaboration with a private developer. The newest hall of residence is the Crathie Student Village on Holburn Street, and houses approximately 100 students.

Other halls of residence include two buildings on the Garthdee Campus; the Square Tower and the Round Tower. These distinctive pink buildings were constructed in the early 1990s and inspired by traditional Scottish tower houses. They have received architectural acclaim by critics and are included in Prospect magazine's list of the 100 best Scottish modern buildings. When the list was published in 2005, the Round and Square Towers were the only buildings in Aberdeen to be included. A number of other halls of residence across the city are used, some operated in-house by RGU and others by private companies. These include Rosemount Halls, St. Peter's Halls and Linksfield Halls which were constructed by the University of Aberdeen and then privatised in the early 2000s. Students also have access to the private halls of residence in Aberdeen which are operated on a commercial basis by specialist companies, such as those owned and operated by the Unite Group.

Sports

RGU SPORT at the Garthdee campus provides a wide range of sport and fitness facilities to the university community as well as to the general public. Facilities include a 25m pool, various gyms with extensive facilities for cardiovascular training and resistance training (including free weights), a large sports hall (also used for exams), climbing wall, numerous fitness classes, physiotherapy, podiatry and sports massage. Students, staff and graduates of the university receive a discount on use of these facilities.

There are over 32 campus sports clubs run by RGU:Union, and the university competes in Scottish Student Sport (SSS) and British Universities and Colleges Sport (BUCS) competitions.

Swimmer Hannah Miley studied at RGU until 2013 and appeared in publicity for the university. A sport scholar program provides support for the athletic and academic careers of developing and elite athletes, including coaching, access to training facilities and financial assistance, as well as flexibility in fitting training around the academic timetable.

The Robert Gordon University Boat Club contests the annual Aberdeen Universities Boat Race each Spring against the University of Aberdeen. RGU were victorious in 2012 2013, 2014, 2015. and 2016.

The two universities also compete annually in the Granite City Challenge which sees teams across a range of sports compete to be the best in the city.

Notable alumni

 Gordon Duthie (born 1987), musician, singer/songwriter
 Ola Gorie, jewellery designer
 Maxwell Hutchinson, architect and broadcaster, guitarist with Lene Lovich
 Eilidh Middleton, equestrian competitor
 Hannah Miley, swimmer and Olympian
 Callum Innes, Turner Prize-nominated artist
 Titi Horsfall, author
 Alan J. Jamieson, marine biologist

International partners
The Robert Gordon University has 2 partner schools in Switzerland:
 Business and Hotel Management School – Switzerland (BA Degree is a joint program between BHMS Switzerland and the Robert Gordon University)
 BVS Business School (Bachelor of Business Administration Degree is a joint program between BVS Switzerland and the Robert Gordon University)

Notable honorary graduates
 Leslie Benzies, Video Game Producer (Doctor of Design 2015)
 Frank Chapman, Businessman (Doctor of Technology 2013)
 Julie Fowlis, Scottish folk singer (Doctor of Music 2013)
 Tony Hayward, Businessman in oil industry (Doctor of Technology 2013)
 Sir Bill Gammell, Businessman (Doctor of Business Administration 2011)
 Michael Clark, Dancer (Doctor of Art 2011)
 Kevin Warwick, Scientist (Doctor of Technology 2011)
 Sir Ranulph Fiennes, Adventurer (Doctor of Science 2010)
 Barbara Dickson, Singer (Doctor of Music 2010)
 Lord Alderdice, Politician (Doctor of Laws 2009)
 Ben de Lisi, Fashion Designer (Doctor of Arts 2009)
 Sir Andrew Motion, Poet (Doctor of Letters 2009)
 Pamela Stephenson-Connolly, Clinical Psychologist (Doctor of Science 2009)
 Nicky Campbell, Journalist and Broadcaster (Doctor of Letters 2008)
 Lord Trimble, Politician (Doctor of Laws 2008)
 Alan Johnston, Journalist (Doctor of Letters 2007)
 Terry Waite, Humanitarian and Author (Doctor of Law 2007)
 Gordon Brown, Politician (Doctor of Laws 2003)
 Lord Norman Foster, Architect (Doctor of Design 2002)
 Baroness Helena Kennedy, Barrister (Doctor of Laws 2002)
 Baron Kinnock, Politician (Doctor of Laws 2002)
 Stewart Milne, Businessman (Doctor of Business Administration 2000)
 Paul Lawrie, Golfer (Doctor of Laws 1999)
 Martin Bell, Journalist and Politician (Doctor of Letters 1998)
 Sir Alex Ferguson, Football Manager (Doctor of Laws 1997)
 Kate Adie, Journalist (Doctor of Letters 1996)

See also 
 Armorial of UK universities
 List of universities in the United Kingdom
 Universities in Scotland

References

External links

Robert Gordon University website
RGU Student Association

 
Educational institutions established in 1992
1992 establishments in Scotland
Universities UK